Heidrunea is a genus of spiders in the family Trechaleidae. It was first described in 1994 by Brescovit & Höfer. , it contains 3 species, all from Brazil.

References

Trechaleidae
Araneomorphae genera
Spiders of Brazil